Aloe hemmingii,  is a species of Aloe found in Somalia.

References

External links
 
 

hemmingii